Taariq Fielies (born 21 June 1992 in Cape Town) is a South African professional soccer player currently playing as a defender for South African side Cape Town City in the South African Premier League.

Club career
After playing for Salt River FC and Rygersdal FC in his early youth he joined the ranks of Ajax Cape Town in 2009. He made his debut for the first team in the home win (1–0) against Maritzburg United on 7 December 2012 by replacing Matthew Booth in the 64th minute.

Career statistics

References

External links
Player profile at Ajax Cape Town

1992 births
Living people
Soccer players from Cape Town
South African soccer players
Cape Town Spurs F.C. players
Milano United F.C. players
Cape Town City F.C. (2016) players
South Africa international soccer players
Association football defenders